Dr Nkosazana Dlamini-Zuma Local Municipality is a local municipality of South Africa. It was established after the 2016 South African municipal elections by the merging of Ingwe and Kwa Sani local municipalities.

Politics 

The municipal council consists of twenty-nine members elected by mixed-member proportional representation. Fifteen councillors are elected by first-past-the-post voting in fifteen wards, while the remaining fourteen are chosen from party lists so that the total number of party representatives is proportional to the number of votes received. 

In the 2021 South African municipal elections the African National Congress (ANC) won a majority of sixteen seats on the council.
The following table shows the results of the election.

References

External links
 

Local municipalities of the Harry Gwala District Municipality